The men's 200 metres event at the 2011 All-Africa Games was held on 14–15 September.

Medalists

Results

Heats
Qualification: First 3 of each heat (Q) and the next 6 fastest (q) qualified for the semifinals.

Wind:Heat 1: -1.1 m/s, Heat 2: -0.1 m/s, Heat 3: +0.1 m/s, Heat 4: -4.1 m/s, Heat 5: -3.0 m/s, Heat 6: -2.8 m/s

Semifinals
Qualification: First 2 of each semifinal (Q) and the next 2 fastest (q) qualified for the final.

Wind:Heat 1: -1.9 m/s, Heat 2: -1.5 m/s, Heat 3: -2.8 m/s

Final
Wind: +1.7 m/s

References
Results
Results

200